Julio Morales may refer to:

 Julio César Morales (born 1993), Mexican-American soccer player
 Julio Morales (Costa Rican footballer) (born 1957), Costa Rican footballer
 Julio Morales (Uruguayan footballer) (1945–2022), Uruguyan footballer